Muralidhar Girls’ College, established in 1940, is an undergraduate women's college in Kolkata, West Bengal, India. It is affiliated with the University of Calcutta.

The mission of the college is to extend educational facilities to all deserving students, including first generation learners. The ultimate goal of the college being empowerment of women, the institution has endeavored to expose its students to emerging areas of knowledge.

Departments

Science

Chemistry
Mathematics
Botany
Statistics
Geography
Psychology
Economics
Fashion Design

Arts

Bengali
English
Sanskrit
History
Political Science
Philosophy
Economics
Education
Journalism and Mass Communication
Sociology
Tourism and Travel Management
Film Studies

Accreditation
Muralidhar Girls' College is recognized by the University Grants Commission (UGC). It was accredited by the National Assessment and Accreditation Council (NAAC), and awarded B++ grade, an accreditation that has since then expired.

See also 
List of colleges affiliated to the University of Calcutta
Education in India
Education in West Bengal

References

External links
Muralidhar Girls’ College

Educational institutions established in 1940
University of Calcutta affiliates
Universities and colleges in Kolkata
Women's universities and colleges in West Bengal
1940 establishments in India